List of champions of the 1894 U.S. National Championships tennis tournament (now known as the US Open). The men's tournament was held from 20 August to 27 August on the outdoor grass courts at the Newport Casino in Newport, Rhode Island. The women's singles and doubles tournament as well as the mixed doubles event was held from 12 June to 16 June on the outdoor grass courts at the Philadelphia Cricket Club in Philadelphia, Pennsylvania. It was the 15th U.S. National Championships and the second Grand Slam tournament of the year.

Finals

Men's singles

 Robert Wrenn defeated  Manliffe Goodbody  6–8, 6–1, 6–4, 6–4

Women's singles

 Helen Hellwig defeated  Aline Terry  7–5, 3–6, 6–0, 3–6, 6–3

Men's doubles
 Clarence Hobart /  Fred Hovey defeated  Carr Neel /  Sam Neel 6–3, 8–6, 6–1

Women's doubles
 Helen Hellwig /  Juliette Atkinson defeated  Annabella Wistar /  Amy Williams 6–4, 8–6, 6–2

Mixed doubles
 Juliette Atkinson /  Edwin P. Fischer defeated  Mrs. McFadden /  Gustav Remak 6–3, 6–2, 6–1

References

External links
Official US Open website

 
U.S. National Championships
U.S. National Championships (tennis) by year
1894 in sports in Rhode Island
1894 in sports in Pennsylvania
June 1894 sports events
August 1894 sports events